Hughes Systique Corporation, (HSC) is a provider of software R&D services. As part of its R&D services, HSC provides Technology Consulting, System Architecture design, Software development, Maintenance and Testing services to Multimedia, Consumer Devices, Telecom/Networking, Wireless/Broadband and Satellite equipment providers.

HSC is headquartered in Rockville, Maryland (USA), a suburb of Washington D.C with a development center in Gurgaon (India), a suburb of New Delhi also another operational center in Bangalore which is a technology hub. HSC is part of the HUGHES group of companies.

HSC is a CMMI Level 5 (development model), ISO 9001 and ISO 27001 certified company.

Technologies
HSC claims to focus on the following key technology areas for its R&D services:

 Embedded Android/Linux 
 Wireless engineering 
 Consumer Electronics (CE) Application development 
 Multiscreen/Second screen 
 Media player development 
 Web portal design 
 IMS RCS VoLTE 
 Enterprise SDK 
 WebRTC 
 Virtualization 
 Cloud services 
 Big data

Industry Affiliations
Federation of Korean Information Industries (FKII)
Amazon Web Services Consulting Partner
Telecommunications Industry Association (TIA)
PCMM Level 3
CMMi Level 5
HTNG Industry Partner
Wireless Broadband Alliance (WBA) Member

See also
Echostar
Dish Network
HughesNet
SPACEWAY
Hughes Network Systems

References

Telecommunications companies of the United States
Companies based in Rockville, Maryland